This is a list of nickname-related list articles on Wikipedia. A nickname is "a familiar or humorous name given to a person or thing instead of or as well as the real name." A nickname is often considered desirable, symbolising a form of acceptance, but can sometimes be a form of ridicule. A moniker also means a nickname or personal name. The word often distinguishes personal names from nicknames that became proper names out of former nicknames. English examples are Bob and Rob, nickname variants for Robert.

Miscellaneous

 Honorific nicknames in popular music
 List of aviators by nickname
 List of classical music sub-titles, nicknames and non-numeric titles
 List of college nickname changes in the United States
 List of Hollywood-inspired nicknames
 List of Marvel Comics nicknames
 List of monarchs by nickname
 List of nicknames of blues musicians
 List of nicknames of jazz musicians
 List of nicknames of philosophers
 List of nicknames of presidents of the United States
 List of nicknames used by George W. Bush
 List of nicknames used by Stephen Colbert
 List of nicknames used by Donald Trump
 List of playing-card nicknames
 List of rabbis known by acronyms
 List of regional nicknames
 List of fandom names
 List of U.S. state and territory nicknames
 Nicknames of politicians and personalities in Quebec
 Scholastic accolades

City nicknames

 List of cities nicknamed Hub of the Universe
 List of city nicknames in Canada
 List of city nicknames in China
 List of city nicknames in India
 List of city nicknames in Indonesia
 List of city nicknames in Japan
 List of city and town nicknames in New Zealand
 List of city and municipality nicknames in the Philippines
 List of city nicknames in Spain
 List of city nicknames in Turkey
 List of city nicknames in the United Kingdom
 List of city nicknames in the United States
 Nicknames of Vancouver

United States

By city (alphabetical by city)

Nicknames of Atlanta
Boston nicknames
Nicknames of Chicago
Nicknames of Cincinnati
List of nicknames for Cleveland
Nicknames of Houston
Nicknames of New York City
Nicknames of Philadelphia
List of nicknames for Pittsburgh
Nicknames of Portland, Oregon

By state

 List of city nicknames in Alabama
 List of city nicknames in Alaska
 List of city nicknames in Arizona
 List of city nicknames in Arkansas
 List of city nicknames in California
 List of city nicknames in Colorado
 List of city nicknames in Connecticut
 List of city nicknames in Delaware
 List of city nicknames in Florida
 List of city nicknames in Georgia
 List of city nicknames in Hawaii
 List of city nicknames in Idaho
 List of city nicknames in Illinois
 List of city nicknames in India
 List of city nicknames in Indiana
 List of city nicknames in Iowa
 List of city nicknames in Kansas
 List of city nicknames in Kentucky
 List of city nicknames in Louisiana
 List of city nicknames in Maine
 List of city nicknames in Maryland
 List of city nicknames in Massachusetts
 List of city nicknames in Michigan
 List of city nicknames in Minnesota
 List of city nicknames in Mississippi
 List of city nicknames in Missouri
 List of city nicknames in Montana
 List of city nicknames in Nebraska
 List of city nicknames in Nevada
 List of city nicknames in New Hampshire
 List of city nicknames in New Jersey
 List of city nicknames in New Mexico
 List of city nicknames in New York
 List of city nicknames in North Carolina
 List of city nicknames in North Dakota
 List of city nicknames in Ohio
 List of city nicknames in Oklahoma
 List of city nicknames in Oregon
 List of city nicknames in Pennsylvania
 List of city nicknames in Puerto Rico
 List of city nicknames in Rhode Island
 List of city nicknames in South Carolina
 List of city nicknames in South Dakota
 List of city nicknames in Tennessee
 List of city nicknames in Texas
 List of city nicknames in Utah
 List of city nicknames in Vermont
 List of city nicknames in Virginia
 List of city nicknames in Washington
 List of city nicknames in West Virginia
 List of city nicknames in Wisconsin
 List of city nicknames in Wyoming

Military nicknames

 List of military figures by nickname
 List of warships by nickname
 List of nicknames of British Army regiments
 Regimental nicknames of the Canadian Forces
 Nicknames of United States Army divisions

Sports nicknames

 Australian national sports team nicknames
 List of baseball nicknames
 List of baseball team nicknames
 List of basketball nicknames
 List of Chicago White Sox nicknames
 List of college sports team nicknames
 List of college team nicknames in the United States
 List of ice hockey nicknames
 List of ice hockey line nicknames
 List of national association football teams by nickname
 List of NFL nicknames
 List of nicknames in motorsport
 List of nicknames used in basketball
 List of nicknames used in CPBL
 List of nicknames used in cricket
 List of nicknames used in tennis
 List of North American football nicknames
 List of Philippine college team nicknames
 List of snooker player nicknames
 List of sports teams nicknamed Titans
 List of sportspeople by nickname

See also

 List of adjectival and demonymic forms of place names
 Athletic nickname
 List of demonyms for U.S. states
 List of people known as The Great
 List of scandals with "-gate" suffix
 List of stage names
 List of lists of lists

References

External links